Lycochoriolaus is a genus of beetles in the family Cerambycidae, containing the following species:

 Lycochoriolaus angustatus (Melzer, 1935)
 Lycochoriolaus angustisternis (Gounelle, 1911)
 Lycochoriolaus ater (Gounelle, 1911)
 Lycochoriolaus aurifer (Linsley, 1970)
 Lycochoriolaus costulatus (Bates, 1885)
 Lycochoriolaus lateralis (Olivier, 1795)
 Lycochoriolaus lyciformis (Pascoe, 1866)
 Lycochoriolaus mimulus (Bates, 1885)
 Lycochoriolaus sericeus (Bates, 1885)
 Lycochoriolaus similis (Linsley, 1970)
 Lycochoriolaus xantho (Bates, 1885)

References

Lepturinae